Ripface Invasion is an American hardcore punk band based out of New Jersey. The band was formed in December 2010 by Anthony "Red" Paladino, the founder of the Earache Records band I.D.K., which was a New Jersey punk band with a large fan following. Red formed Ripface Invasion to pick up where I.D.K. left off, bringing in I.D.K. bass player Tom Conti. The current lineup consists of Red on vocals, Tom Conti on bass guitar and Dan "Drummer D" Lockhart (formerly of the popular hardcore band One4One who was signed to hardcore label Stillborn Records which is owned and operated by Jamey Jasta of the band Hatebreed)as well as Triple Crown Records on drums.  The most recent addition to the Ripface Invasion lineup is Joe EC (Elviz Christ) who is the founder and guitarist of New Jersey thrash metal outfit Saint Avarice. The band has released a four-song EP on July 5, 2011. They subsequently released a 3-song EP as well as a 7-inch record. Past members play on the first CD / record.  Past members have included various players from NJ bands such as E-town Concrete, Agents of Man and Backlash.

The band has played locally since their start, and have released a music video for their song "The Last One On Earth" which was released independently.  The band is currently a featured artist on Seton Hall's Pirate Radio, 89.5 WSOU with a fair amount of air play and is a regular tune heard on WSIA, which can be heard on 88.9 in Staten Island. The band has also been featured in the NJ zine The Aquarian Weekly.

In 2012 the band was signed to NJ hardcore / punk label Scorpion Records who has featured other artists such as 25 ta Life and released their 3-song EP "To Not Give In".

Both EPs and 7inch record have artwork designed and created by Joe Martino, New Jersey comic book artist.

The band's second music video with their current lineup for the song "To Not Give In" was released October 4, 2012.

Videography
 "The Last One On Earth" (2011)
 "To Not Give In" (2012)

Current members
 Anthony "Red" Paladino - vocals and founding member
 Joe EC - Guitar
 Tom Conti - bass 
 Dan "Drummer D" Lockhart - Drums (Formerly of One4One and A Moments Peace)

Former members
Rey Fonseca
Ron Taylor
Fabio Amato 
Mike Nappi
Anthony "Lefty" Clemente
Ken Pescatore

Live / Touring Support

Joe EC (Elviz Christ) - 2011 - Guitar (Saint Avarice)

References

External links
 
 http://www.billboard.com/artist/ripface-invasion/discography/songs/1822266#/artist/ripface-invasion/1822266

Musical groups established in 2010
Crossover thrash groups
American thrash metal musical groups
Heavy metal musical groups from New Jersey
Musical groups from New Jersey
Hardcore punk groups from New Jersey
2010 establishments in New Jersey
People from Fairview, New Jersey